The 2001 Norwegian Figure Skating Championships was held at the Lørenhallen in Oslo from January 12 to 14, 2001. Skaters competed in the discipline of single skating. The results were used to choose the teams to the 2001 World Championships, the 2001 European Championships, the 2001 Nordic Championships, and the 2001 World Junior Championships.

Senior results

Ladies

Junior results

Ladies

References

External links
 results

Norwegian Figure Skating Championships
Norwegian Figure Skating Championships, 2001
2001 in Norwegian sport
Norwegian Figure Skating Championships